Kaity Dunstan (born 25 February 1996), known by her stage name Cloves (stylised CLOVES), is an Australian singer-songwriter.

Background

Early life and The Voice
Born on 25 February 1996, Dunstan began performing at age thirteen with her sister in local bars and pubs. She wrote her first song at age eleven. She appeared in season two of The Voice Australia in 2013, singing Melanie's "Brand New Key" during her audition. The song peaked at number 40 on the ARIA singles chart. She was later eliminated during the battle rounds after performing "Girls Just Wanna Have Fun".

2015–present
In 2015, under the new moniker Cloves, which was inspired by a trip to Bali, she released her first track "Frail Love". Later, she released her debut single, "Don't You Wait", off her debut EP, XIII. Another track, called "Everybody's Son", was also released. The song was featured in The Vampire Diaries, Season 7, episode 20. On 20 November 2015, she released her EP XIII through Universal Music Australia, which includes all previous songs and a track called "Don't Forget About Me". The song was featured on the soundtrack of the 2016 film Me Before You and released as a single on 22 June 2018, with the music video being released the next day.

She performed at the Coachella and Lollapalooza music festivals in 2016. On 18 November 2016, Cloves released the lead single of her debut album, entitled "Better Now". On 19 May 2017, she released the second single, "California Numb". On 1 February 2018, the third single, "Bringing the House Down", was released. Later that year, on 25 May 2018, the fourth single, "Wasted Time", was released. "Hit Me Hard", the fifth single of the album, was released on 24 August 2018. Her debut album, One Big Nothing, was released on 28 September 2018. The album contains ten songs overall, three of those being new songs, two being rearranged versions of "Frail Love" and "Don't You Wait", and the rest being the previous singles.

Discography

Studio albums

Extended plays

Singles

As lead artist

As featured artist

Promotional singles

Music videos

As lead artist

As featured artist

Notes

References

External links

Australian women singer-songwriters
Living people
Singers from Melbourne
1996 births
21st-century Australian singers
21st-century Australian women singers